The blackspot climbing perch (Ctenopharynx intermedius) is a species of fish in the family Cichlidae. It is native to Lake Malawi and the upper Shire River.

References 

blackspot climbing perch
Fish of Malawi
blackspot climbing perch
Taxa named by Albert Günther
Taxonomy articles created by Polbot
Fish of Lake Malawi